Lake Kerinci is a lake in Jambi, Indonesia.

The cyprinid fish Osteochilus kerinciensis is named after Lake Kerinci, its type locality.

See also
 List of lakes of Indonesia

References

Kerinci
Landforms of Jambi